A political endorsement is a public declaration of one's personal or group's support of a candidate for elected office. In a multiparty system, where one party considers that it does not have enough support to win power, just prior to the election, the official representative of that party may give an official endorsement for a party that they consider more likely to be a contender. In Australian electoral law, "electoral endorsement" is a specific term and a candidate can only be endorsed by a registered party. There are also presidential endorsements.

Literature
 

Elections
 
Voting theory